The 28th Golden Raspberry Awards, or Razzies, were held on February 23, 2008, in Santa Monica, California to honor the worst films the film industry had to offer in 2007. The nominations were announced on January 21. In line with Razzies tradition, both the nominee announcements and ceremony preceded the corresponding Academy Awards functions by one day.

The most nominated films of 2007 were I Know Who Killed Me, I Now Pronounce You Chuck & Larry and Norbit with eight nominations each. I Know Who Killed Me was the big winner of the evening, receiving seven awards. Eddie Murphy received a Razzie record five personal nominations, all surrounding his work (especially his performance of multiple characters) in Norbit. He ended up winning three awards, one for each character he portrayed. Actress Lindsay Lohan also won two awards for her dual roles in I Know Who Killed Me. The special category introduced this year was Worst Excuse for a Horror Movie.

Winners and nominees

Films with multiple nominations 
The following films received multiple nominations:

See also 

 2007 in film
 80th Academy Awards
 61st British Academy Film Awards
 65th Golden Globe Awards
 14th Screen Actors Guild Awards

References

External links 

 2007 Winners
 2007 Razzie Nominees on the Razzies Official home page

Golden Raspberry Awards
Golden Raspberry Awards ceremonies
2008 in American cinema
February 2008 events in the United States
Golden Raspberry